George Caspar Adams (April 24, 1863 – July 13, 1900) was an American football player and former head coach of the Harvard University football program from 1890 to 1892. He co-coached with George A. Stewart, another Harvard graduate.

Early life
George Caspar Adams was born on April 24, 1863, in Boston, Massachusetts, to politician John Quincy Adams II and Fannie Cadwallader Crowninshield. His father was born to Charles Francis Adams Sr., thus a grandson of U.S president John Quincy Adams His mother was also a granddaughter of United States Secretary of the Navy Benjamin Williams Crowninshield under presidents James Madison and James Monroe. Adams attended the Adams Academy before entering Harvard in 1882, where he graduated with an A.B. in 1886.

Football career
During his time as a student at Harvard, Adams played a vital role in reinstating the football program in 1886 for Harvard by heading a petition movement to the administration. Once the season was granted, Adams played on the team and assisted in managing and coaching it.

In 1890, Adams, along with another fellow alumnus, George A. Stewart (Class of 1884) were appointed as coaches for the Harvard football program of the upcoming season. In their first season, the team went 11–0, winning the national championship, also with five players being named All-Americans. The appointment of Adams and Stewart is widely regarded to be the beginning of an organized coaching system at Harvard.

Head coaching record

Later life 
Adams later resided in Boston where he worked for real estate. He was also a recreational yachtsman who belonged to many yacht clubs. Adams died of tuberculosis in Quincy on July 13, 1900.

Family tree

Paternal side

Maternal side

References

External links

1863 births
1900 deaths
19th-century players of American football
Adams political family
American football ends
American football halfbacks
Crowninshield family
Harvard Crimson football coaches
Harvard Crimson football players
Sportspeople from Boston
Players of American football from Boston
19th-century deaths from tuberculosis
Tuberculosis deaths in Massachusetts